School District 87 Stikine is a school district in British Columbia. It covers the northwest corner of the province along the Alaska and Yukon borders. This includes the communities of Dease Lake, Lower Post, Telegraph Creek, and Atlin.

Schools

See also
List of school districts in British Columbia

87